Namma Ooru Poovatha is a 1990 Indian Tamil-language film directed by Manivasagam and produced by Rajeshwari Manivasakam. The film stars Murali, Gautami, Goundamani and Senthil. It was released on 19 November 1990, and Gautami won the Tamil Nadu State Film Award Special Prize for Best Actress.

Plot

Cast 

Murali as Ponarasu
Gautami as Poovatha
Goundamani as Everything Ekambaram
Senthil as Ekabaram's sidekick.
Jai Ganesh
Anandaraj
Pasi Narayanan
Thideer Kannaiah
Dubbing Janaki
Ganga
K. K. Soundar
P. S. Mani
Suryakanth
Karuppu Subbiah
Master Anandhan
Joker Thulasi
Appu
Thanjai Nallon
T. Rajamani
J. Naadar
Uma Mohan
Maheswari
K. Janaki
Vijayadurga
M. R. Sulakshana
Vasuki
Theni Kunjamaal
V. Prabhadevi
Ganga
Vadivu
J. Mala
Latha
Pondicherry Jayanthi
Chitra Guptan

Soundtrack 
The music was composed by Deva, with lyrics by Kalidasan.

Release and reception
Namma Ooru Poovatha was released on 19 November 1990. C. R. K. of Kalki wrote it is a typical love story set in a village backdrop; even if viewers understand the direction the story leading to during the beginning of the film, the efforts made by the director to carry it without losing momentum were perfect. Gautami won the Tamil Nadu State Film Award Special Prize for Best Actress.

References

External links 
 

1990 films
1990s Tamil-language films
Films directed by Manivasagam
Films scored by Deva (composer)